Dalberg is a German noble family.

Dalberg may also refer to:

 Dalberg, Rhineland-Palatinate, a municipality in Germany
 Adolphus von Dalberg, a Prince-abbot of Fulda and founder of the Fulda university
 Dalberg Global Development Advisors, a strategy and policy advisory firm

See also
 
 Dahlberg (disambiguation)
Dalbergia, a genus of trees, shrubs and lianas